Aleksandr Nikolayevich Kashtanov (25 March 1928 – 8 February 2022) was a Soviet and Russian agronomist and politician.

A member of the Communist Party, he served on the Supreme Soviet of the Russian SFSR from 1971 to 1980. He died on 8 February 2022, at the age of 93.

References

1928 births
2022 deaths
People from Bronnitsky Uyezd
Academicians of the VASKhNIL
Academicians of the Russian Academy of Agriculture Sciences
Full Members of the Russian Academy of Sciences
Members of the Supreme Soviet of the Russian Soviet Federative Socialist Republic, 1971–1975
Members of the Supreme Soviet of the Russian Soviet Federative Socialist Republic, 1975–1980
Honoured Scientists of the Russian Federation
Recipients of the Order "For Merit to the Fatherland", 4th class
Recipients of the Order of Lenin
Recipients of the Order of the Red Banner of Labour
State Prize of the Russian Federation laureates
Russian agronomists
Russian memoirists
Russian soil scientists
Soviet agronomists
Soviet memoirists
Soviet soil scientists